Veľké Bielice is a part of Partizánske and municipality in Partizánske District in the Trenčín Region of western Slovakia. It's well known for its football clubs, that's been active for over 60 years. Village also has rich cultural life with folk bands and various drama clubs. Romano-catholic church of st. Elizabeth Hungarian situated here was built between 1723 – 1759, but historians suspect it was already built on different location in the 14th century. Nowadays church is part of Bielice's cemetery.

History
According to some historians we can find mentions of village in the early 11th century. Officially in historical records the village was first mentioned in 1078. In 1386 village became personal property of Forgáč family. From 1884 village became for whole 12 years an important traffic point thanks to establishment of railway. Village became part of Partizanske district in  1976.

Geography
Village sits north-east from the town of Topolcany by the river Nitrica. It has a population of about 1,983 people.

External links
https://web.archive.org/web/20080724151326/http://www.zsvbielice.edu.sk/historia_vb.htm

Villages and municipalities in Partizánske District